The  is a Roman theatre located in Sagunto, Spain. It was declared  in 1896. The Roman Theatre of Sagunto is located at the foot of the mountain, crowned by Sagunto Castle. It occupies the intermediate terrace, between the city and the upper platform chaired by the Forum, Civic Center of the municipality, responding to an urban planning of the times of Emperor Augustus. It was built in the middle of the first century, using the slope of the mountain. It is semicircular in shape and can seat 8,000 spectators.

See also 
 List of Bien de Interés Cultural in the Province of Valencia
 List of Roman theatres

References 

Bien de Interés Cultural landmarks in the Province of Valencia
Ancient Roman theatres in Spain
Sagunto